is a Japanese football player. He plays for Grulla Morioka.

Career
Ichiro Suzuki joined J3 League club Grulla Morioka in 2016.

References

External links

1995 births
Living people
Fuji University alumni
Association football people from Iwate Prefecture
Japanese footballers
J3 League players
Iwate Grulla Morioka players
Association football defenders